The 2011 Judo Grand Prix Amsterdam was held in Amsterdam, Netherlands from 19 to 20 November 2011.

Medal summary

Men's events

Women's events

Source Results

Medal table

References

External links
 

2011 IJF World Tour
2011 Judo Grand Prix
Judo
Judo competitions in the Netherlands
Judo
Judo